Extended Play is the debut extended play by American artist Austin Mahone released on May 29, 2013 from Republic Records only in Japan.

Development and release
The songs are produced by DJ Frank E, Mike Fresh, Trent Mazur, Bei Maejor, Austin Mahone, Bruce Robinson, Steve Mac, Matt Mahaffey. The extended play was released only in Japan from Chase and Republic to promote his songs in the country. The deluxe version backpack the first three video clips of Mahone, plus a short documentary with a message for the Japanese fans.

Singles
 "Say Somethin" was released as the lead single on June 5, 2012 and peaked 34 in Billboard Pop Songs.
 "Say You're Just a Friend" was released as the second single in his career on December 3, 2012. The song peaked number 4 in Billboard Bubbling Under Hot 100, number 2 in Belgium Ultratip charts and 12 in Japan. The song features American rapper Flo Rida.

Promotional singles
 "11:11" was released as first promotional single on February 12, 2012.
 "Heart in My Hand (Piano Version)" was released as second promotional single on April 16, 2013.

Commercial performance 
In Japan, this album debuted at number 17 on the Oricon weekly album chart.
According to Oricon, this album spent 12 weeks on the Oricon weekly album top 300 chart.

Track listing

Charts

Release history

References

Austin Mahone albums
2013 debut EPs
Albums produced by DJ Frank E